The Piapot Urban Reserve is an Indian reserve of the Piapot Cree Nation in Saskatchewan. It is in the city of Regina.

References

Indian reserves in Saskatchewan
Urban Indian reserves in Canada
Piapot Cree Nation
Regina, Saskatchewan